The Military Prosecution Service or Judge Advocate General's Corps (short FAUK) is a Danish independent military prosecutor and the legal branch of the Danish military. It is a Level.I command and is under the Ministry of Defence. The Judge Advocate General heads the Defence Judge Advocate Corps. It is located at Kastellet in Copenhagen.

The Judge Advocate General and Judge Advocates are members of the military system, but outside the military rank system. The Chief of Defence, otherwise the commander of all Danish military personnel, does not have authority over Judge advocates prosecutors.

In a military criminal case the Defence Judge Advocate Corps conducts investigation and decides whether or not a charge should be brought up.

List of Judge Advocate Generals

See also
Judge Advocate General
 http://fauk.dk

Notes

References

Bibliography
 
 

Military of Denmark
Law of Denmark
Region-specific legal occupations
Legal occupations in the military
Denmark